Thorunna australis is a species of sea slug, a dorid nudibranch, a shell-less marine gastropod mollusk in the family Chromodorididae.

Distribution 
This species was described from New Caledonia. It has been reported from Japan, the Philippines, Indonesia, the Marshall Islands and South Africa.

Description
This species is similar in shape and coloration to species of the Hypselodoris maculosa species complex, especially Hypselodoris paradisa.

References

External links
 

Chromodorididae
Gastropods described in 1928